Lily Neo (née Tirtasana; ; born 12 August 1953) is a Singaporean medical practitioner and former politician. A former member of the governing People's Action Party (PAP), she was a Member of Parliament (MP) between 1997 and 2020.

Early life and education
An Indonesian Chinese, Neo was born in Medan, North Sumatra, Indonesia on 12 August 1953. She studied at Primary Thamrin Methodist School in Medan between 1961 and 1969 before attending Methodist High School in Penang.

She subsequently went on to complete a Bachelor of Medicine, Bachelor of Surgery degree at the Royal College of Surgeons in Ireland in 1980.

Career
After completing medical school, Neo has been a self-employed medical practitioner since 1982, where she also became a member of the governing People's Action Party (PAP).

Neo made her political debut in the 1997 general election and won. She was elected into Parliament as the Member of Parliament (MP) representing the Kim Seng ward of Kreta Ayer–Tanglin GRC.

During the 2001 general election, Neo was part of the five-member PAP team contesting in Jalan Besar GRC and won 74.49% of the vote against the opposition Singapore Democratic Alliance. She was elected into Parliament again as the Member of Parliament (MP) representing the Kreta Ayer–Kim Seng ward of Jalan Besar GRC.

During the 2006 general election, Neo was part of the five-member PAP team contesting in Jalan Besar GRC and won 69.26% of the vote against the opposition Singapore Democratic Alliance.

During the 2011 general election, she was part of the five-member PAP team contesting in Tanjong Pagar GRC and won an uncontested walkover.

During the 2015 general election, Neo was part of the four-member PAP team contesting in Jalan Besar GRC and won 67.75% of the vote against the opposition Worker's Party..

Neo served as the chairperson of Tanjong Pagar Town Council between 2011 and 2015 and chairperson of Jalan Besar Town Council between 2015 and 2020. 

She was also Deputy Chairperson for the Social and Family Development Government Parliamentary Committee and Member of the Parliament House Committee and Transport Government Parliamentary Committee. 

She previously served as the chairperson for various Government Parliamentary Committees and Treasurer for PAP Women's Wing, and has supported social measures to support the low-income, particularly the elderly and young children.

Neo retired from politics in July 2020 before the 2020 general election.

Personal life
Neo is married Ben Neo, a obstetrician and gynaecologist. They have two children. Neo is a Christian and enjoys playing the piano, swimming and reading.

See also
 List of Singapore MPs
 List of current Singapore MPs

References

1953 births
Living people
Members of the Parliament of Singapore
People from Medan
Indonesian people of Chinese descent
Indonesian emigrants to Singapore
Naturalised citizens of Singapore
Singaporean women in politics
20th-century Singaporean physicians
Women physicians
20th-century Singaporean politicians
21st-century Singaporean politicians
People's Action Party politicians
Alumni of the Royal College of Surgeons in Ireland
21st-century women politicians
20th-century women politicians